Anton Grbac (born 16 January 1961) is a former Australian rules footballer who played with Essendon in the Victorian Football League (VFL).

Grbac, a defender, was recruited from St. Bernard's College. He made two league appearances for Essendon, late in the 1982 VFL season, in wins over St Kilda at Moorabbin Oval and Geelong at Windy Hill.

He went to South Australian National Football League club West Torrens in 1984.

References

1961 births
Australian rules footballers from Victoria (Australia)
Essendon Football Club players
West Torrens Football Club players
Living people